Geoff Dyer (born 5 June 1958) is an English author. He has written a number of novels and non-fiction books, some of which have won literary awards.

Personal background
Dyer was born and raised in Cheltenham, England, as the only child of a sheet metal worker father and a school dinner lady mother. He was educated at the local grammar school and won a scholarship to study English at Corpus Christi College, Oxford. After graduating from Oxford, he claimed unemployment benefits, and moved into a property in Brixton with other former Oxford students. He credits this period with teaching him the craft of writing. His debut novel, The Colour of Memory, is set in Brixton in the 1980s, the decade that Dyer lived there. The novel has been described as a "fictionalization of Dyer's 20s". He is married to Rebecca Wilson, chief curator at Saatchi Art, Los Angeles. He currently lives in Venice, California. In March 2014, Dyer said he had had a minor stroke earlier in the year, shortly after moving to live in Venice, Los Angeles.

Writing career
Dyer is the author of the following novels: The Colour of Memory; The Search; Paris Trance; and Jeff in Venice, Death in Varanasi. He wrote a critical study of John Berger – Ways of Telling – and two collections of essays: Anglo-English Attitudes and Working the Room.  A selection of essays from these collections entitled Otherwise Known as the Human Condition was published in the U.S. in April 2011 and won the National Book Critics Circle Award for Criticism.

Dyer has written the following genre-defying titles: But Beautiful (on jazz); The Missing of the Somme (on the memorialization of the First World War); Out of Sheer Rage (about D. H. Lawrence); Yoga For People Who Can’t Be Bothered To Do It; The Ongoing Moment (on photography); Zona (about Andrei Tarkovsky's 1979 film Stalker); and Broadsword Calling Danny Boy (about Brian G. Hutton's 1968 film Where Eagles Dare). In 2019, Out of Sheer Rage was listed by Slate as one of the 50 greatest nonfiction works of the past 25 years. He is the editor of John Berger: Selected Essays and co-editor, with Margaret Sartor, of What Was True: The Photographs and Notebooks of William Gedney.

It has been described by David Finkel, author of Thank You for Your Service, as "what we’ve all come to expect from Geoff Dyer—another great book. I loved everything about it. It’s brilliantly observed, beautifully written, incisive, funny, and filled with stirring truths about life and the value of service." Billy Collins, the former United States Poet Laureate and author of Aimless Love, said: "Geoff Dyer has managed to do again what he does best: insert himself into an exotic and demanding environment (sometimes, his own flat, but here, the violent wonders of an aircraft carrier) and file a report that mixes empathetic appreciation with dips into brilliant comic deflation. Welcome aboard the edifying and sometimes hilarious ship Dyer."

Dyer was made a Fellow of the Royal Society of Literature in 2005. In 2014 he was elected as an Honorary Fellow of Corpus Christi College, Oxford.

In 2013 he served as the Bedell Distinguished Visiting Professor at the University of Iowa's Nonfiction Writing Program. He now teaches in the PhD program at the University of Southern California.

Awards and honours
1992: Somerset Maugham Award winner for But Beautiful
1992: John Llewellyn Rhys Prize shortlisted for But Beautiful
1998: National Book Critics Circle Award finalist in Criticism for Out of Sheer Rage
2003: Lannan Literary Fellowship
2004: W H Smith Best Travel Book Award winner for Yoga For People Who Can’t Be Bothered To Do It
2005: Fellow of the Royal Society of Literature
2006: Winner of the E. M. Forster Award from the American Academy of Arts and Letters
2006: International Center of Photography (ICP) Infinity Award for Writing on photography for The Ongoing Moment
2009: GQ Writer of the Year Award
2009: Bollinger Everyman Wodehouse Prize for Best Comic Novel for Jeff in Venice, Death in Varanasi
2011: National Book Critics Circle Award for Criticism winner for Otherwise Known as the Human Condition
2015: Windham–Campbell Literature Prize (Non-Fiction) valued at $150,000

Publications

Books
 
 
 
 
 
 
 U.S. edition:

Critical studies and reviews of Dyer's work

References

External links

 
 
 Geoff Dyer at the complete review
 "In conversation with ... Geoff Dyer" (15 November 2010, with podcast) – interview with Geoff Dyer about his 2010 collection of essays, Working The Room
 Geoff Dyer, The Art of Nonfiction No. 6 by Matthew Specktor in The Paris Review 
 Interview with Dyer on Notebook on Cities and Culture

1958 births
Living people
English male non-fiction writers
English non-fiction writers
English travel writers
English writers about music
Fellows of the Royal Society of Literature
People from Cheltenham
The New Yorker people